Thandi Moraka is a South African politician who is currently serving as a Member of the Limpopo Provincial Legislature. She was Member of the Executive Council (MEC) for Sports, Arts and Culture in the Limpopo provincial government between July 2018 and October 2022. She is a member of the African National Congress (ANC) and in 2022 was elected to a five-year term on the party's National Executive Committee. She formerly served as Deputy Secretary-General of the ANC Youth League from 2015 to 2019 and as a member of the Limpopo ANC's Provincial Executive Committee from 2018 to 2022.

Career in the ANC

Limpopo ANCYL 
Moraka rose to prominence as an activist in the African National Congress (ANC) and the ANC Youth League (ANCYL). Her local ANC branch is in Modimolle in the Waterberg region of South Africa's Limpopo province. Until 2010, she was Deputy Provincial Secretary of the ANCYL's Limpopo branch under ANCYL Provincial Chairperson Lehlogonolo Masoga. The Star labelled her a member of the Limpopo ANCYL's "Makhado brigade", a group led by Masoga which "openly defied" national ANCYL President Julius Malema at the Limpopo ANCYL's provincial elective conference in Makhado in April 2010. That conference was marred by disruptions and police intervention; Moraka and the other members of the putative brigade were voted out of their positions and replaced by allies of Malema.

Arrest: 2010 
On 10 April 2010, as Moraka drove home from the chaotic Makhado conference, she was arrested by an off-duty traffic officer on the N1 near Botlokwa and detained briefly at Mphephu police station. The ANCYL alleged that she had stolen important league documents which accredited the delegates to the conference and without which the conference could not proceed. Her arrest was viewed as retaliation by the pro-Malema faction of the ANCYL. 

The national leadership of the ANCYL laid a criminal charge of theft against Moraka, pertaining to the documents allegedly taken by her, and released a statement providing the following account of the incident: Despite the calls made by the President of the ANCYL for delegates to return to the conference some persisted in their actions without regard for the majority of delegates. The former Deputy Secretary of the ANCYL Cde Thandi Moraka stole the conference credentials and attempted to flee from Makhado en route to Polokwane. She was then located by the police and found in possession of the conference credentials, an ID document and accreditation tags of delegates determined to collapse [render inquorate] the Provincial Conference of the ANCYL. A criminal case of theft was opened against her.On 19 July 2010, Moraka appeared in the Dzanani Magistrate's Court and the theft case was struck off the court roll. Moraka welcomed the decision, saying that the matter was an internal political dispute unsuitable for litigation. She subsequently laid a complaint with the Public Protector, Thuli Madonsela; she alleged that her arrest had been ordered by Pinky Kekana, who was then the Member of the Executive Council (MEC) for Roads and Transport in the Limpopo provincial government and who was viewed as an ally of Malema. Kekana dismissed this allegation as "malicious".

The report of Madonsela's investigation, entitled "State Power – Political Games", was released in late September 2012 and concluded that Moraka's arrest had been unlawful. According to Madonsela, the arrest had indeed been ordered by Kekana, an improper directive which amounted to an abuse of power and to maladministration in that Kekana "employed state resources to settle a political score" in respect of private party-political rivalries. Madonsela also pointed out that the arrest had been unnecessary because Moraka had voluntarily cooperated with the officer who pulled her over and because no criminal charge had been laid against her at that time. By way of remedial action, Madonsela instructed Kekana to apologise to Moraka and also instructed the Premier of Limpopo to "take disciplinary action" against Kekana.

Deputy Chairperson: 2015 
On 4 May 2015, at a provincial league elective conference near Tzaneen, Moraka was elected as the Deputy Provincial Chairperson of the Limpopo branch of the ANCYL, serving under Provincial Chairperson Vincent Shoba.

ANCYL Deputy Secretary: 2015–2019 
Later in 2015, on 4 September, the national ANCYL held its 25th national elective conference in Gauteng's Midrand and Moraka was elected unopposed to the more senior position of national ANCYL Deputy Secretary-General. She served under ANCYL President Collen Maine and ANCYL Secretary-General Njabulo Nzuza. She and the other officials remained in office until late July 2019, when the national ANC leadership disbanded the ANCYL leadership corps.

According to the Mail & Guardian, during this period Moraka had an increasingly tense relationship with ANCYL President Maine. In April 2018, speaking at an ANC Women's League memorial service for Winnie Madikizela-Mandela, Moraka said that Maine was "a sellout of note" and called for his resignation. Her remarks followed Maine's public confession that he had met with the controversial Gupta family; according to Moraka, this revelation showed that, during the presidency of Jacob Zuma, Maine had been hypocritical in benefitting from state capture while publicly denying that it existed.

Provincial Executive Committee: 2018–2022 
In June 2018, at an elective conference of the Limpopo branch of the mainstream ANC, Moraka was elected to an ordinary seat of the Provincial Executive Committee of the ANC in Limpopo. She was also elected to its Provincial Working Committee.

In May 2022, near the expiry of the committee's term, Moraka confirmed that she had been asked to stand for election as Deputy Provincial Chairperson of the Limpopo ANC, and intended to do so, running against the incumbent, Florence Radzilani. However, when the party's next provincial elective conference was held in June 2022, Moraka's bid to unseat Radzilani failed. She also failed to gain re-election to the Provincial Executive Committee.

Nonetheless, when the national ANC held its 55th National Conference in December 2022, Moraka was elected to a five-year term on the party's National Executive Committee; by number of votes received, she was ranked last of the 80 candidates elected, receiving 946 votes across the 4,029 ballots cast in total. City Press said that she was viewed as an ally of Cyril Ramaphosa, the incumbent ANC president and President of South Africa.

Career in government 
By 2014, Moraka was a Member of the Limpopo Provincial Legislature. She was re-elected to her seat in the 2014 general election, ranked 13th on the ANC's provincial party list. In late July 2018, after her election to the Limpopo ANC's Provincial Executive Committee, Moraka was appointed to the Limpopo Executive Council by the Premier of Limpopo, Stan Mathabatha. She became MEC for Sports, Arts and Culture, succeeding Onicca Moloi. The ANCYL welcomed her appointment. She was re-elected to her legislative seat in the 2019 general election, ranked 26th on the ANC's party list, and Mathabatha retained her in his new Executive Council, still as MEC for Sports, Arts and Culture.

However, in early October 2022, Mathabatha fired Moraka, replacing her with Nakedi Sibanda-Kekana in a reshuffle that was viewed as connected to the ANC's internal elections in June 2022: the other two MECs fired in the reshuffle, Polly Boshielo and Dickson Masemola, had, like Moraka, failed to gain re-election to the ANC Provincial Executive Committee. Although she left the Executive Council, Moraka remained an ordinary Member of the Provincial Legislature.

References

External links 

"Former ANCYL boss implicated in receiving 'kickback' cash from Eskom slush fund" at News24

21st-century South African politicians
Living people

Year of birth missing (living people)
African National Congress politicians
Members of the Limpopo Provincial Legislature